The Safety Curtain is a 1918 American silent melodrama film directed by Sidney Franklin and starring Norma Talmadge. Talmadge and her husband Joe Schenck produced the film and distributed through Select Pictures.

Cast
Norma Talmadge as Puck
Eugene O'Brien as Captain Merryon
Anders Randolf as Vulcan (credited as Anders Randolph)
Gladden James as Sylvester
Lillian Hall as Ballet Girl

Preservation status
This film is preserved at EYE Institut, aka Filmmuseum in the Netherlands and at UCLA Film and Television Archive.

References

External links

Lantern slide(Wayback Machine)

1918 films
American silent feature films
Films directed by Sidney Franklin
Films based on works by Ethel M. Dell
Films based on short fiction
American black-and-white films
Silent American drama films
1918 drama films
Melodrama films
Selznick Pictures films
1910s American films